Pauloterminus is an extinct genus of bivalved arthropod known from Early Cambrian (about 520 to 516 million years ago) Sirius Passet locality of northern Greenland. It is tentatively classified under the family Waptiidae.

The genus only has a single species P. spinodorsalis. It was first described by the paleontologist Rod S. Taylor in 2002. Its generic name is derived from Latin paulus ("small") and terminus ("end"). The specific name is from Latin spina ("thorn") and dorsalis ("of the back").

Description 
The ovoid-shaped bivalved carapace encloses the head and the anterior section of the trunk. The carapace is slightly less than twice as long as it is tall, and becomes wider posteriorly. The head is poorly known, though it is suggested that they lacked eyes. One specimen has partially preserved pair of segmented antennae, which have at least 4 segments, which decrease in length towards the end of the antenna. The thorax was likely tube shaped, and had six segments, each associated with a pair of biramous limbs, which decrease in size posteriorly. The limb endopods are thin and annulate, and approximately 1mm in width, while the exopods were lobe-shaped and bore setae. The abdomen was limbless and had five segments, and terminated in a pair of segmented caudal flukes.

Taxonomy 
In its original description, Pauloterminus was noted to be morphologically similar to Waptia and Chuandianella, both historically considered "waptiids", but it is unclear whether the group is monophyletic.

References

Prehistoric arthropod genera
Fossils of Greenland

Hymenocarina